Sandy Osei-Agyemang (born 19 July 1949) is a Ghanaian former sprinter who competed in the 1972 Summer Olympics.

Sandy advanced to the second round in the Men's 100 metres and Men's 4 × 100 metres relay at the 1972 Summer Olympics.

References

1949 births
Living people
Ghanaian male sprinters
Olympic athletes of Ghana
Athletes (track and field) at the 1972 Summer Olympics
Eastern Illinois Panthers men's track and field athletes